Donadi is a surname. Notable people with the surname include:

Dani Donadi (born 1967), Italian film composer and record producer
Massimo Donadi (born 1963), Italian politician

Italian-language surnames